RASEI (pronounced RAY-see) is a joint institute between the University of Colorado Boulder (CU-Boulder) and the National Renewable Energy Laboratory (NREL); located in Boulder, Colorado. The institute's functions are to address complex energy problems through a multidisciplinary and multi-institutional approach. It provides expedited solutions to transform energy by applying renewable energy science, engineering and analysis through research, education and industry partnerships.

RASEI's Goals

 Create an Integrated Energy Campus: To create a world-leading venue for energy research and education that benefits from the concentration of academic institutions, federal research laboratories and businesses involved in the green economy along Colorado’s Front Range.

 Perform Innovative Research: To develop a comprehensive and multidisciplinary approach to research that meets the scientific and institutional energy challenges of the 21st century.

 Educate Energy Leaders and Workforce: Provide programs, lectures and opportunities that prepare students to become the energy leaders of the future.

 Develop Industry Partnerships: To engage industry partners in comprehensive programs involving energy research, education, policy and technology development.

Understanding the Scale and Complexity of the Energy Challenge
We face an unprecedented global energy challenge. Energy demand is projected to double within the next few decades and continue to grow through the end of the century. To meet this ever-growing demand, energy industries of the 21st century need an entirely new infrastructure that produces more energy at a lower cost, uses energy more efficiently, and improves the security of supply by relying more on domestic and stable sources and produces far fewer greenhouse gas emissions.

The scale and complexity of the energy challenge, along with the intense competition in the energy marketplace, necessitate a comprehensive approach for developing new energy industries. A measured investment from the public and private sectors and new models for public-private partnerships are required.

Understanding the dynamics of this new marketplace and the factors governing a sustainable energy system are crucial for emerging energy industries to succeed. These systems must meet multiple requirements, such as scaling to a terawatt, use readily available resources for manufacturing, and have a sustainable lifecycle.

Notable people
Arthur Nozik

References

University of Colorado Boulder
Renewable energy in the United States